Sir Roger Penrose  (born 8 August 1931) is a British mathematician, mathematical physicist, philosopher of science and Nobel Laureate in Physics. He is Emeritus Rouse Ball Professor of Mathematics in the University of Oxford, an emeritus fellow of Wadham College, Oxford, and an honorary fellow of St John's College, Cambridge and University College London.

Penrose has contributed to the mathematical physics of general relativity and cosmology. He has received several prizes and awards, including the 1988 Wolf Prize in Physics, which he shared with Stephen Hawking for the Penrose–Hawking singularity theorems, and the 2020 Nobel Prize in Physics "for the discovery that black hole formation is a robust prediction of the general theory of relativity". He is regarded as one of the greatest living physicists, mathematicians and scientists, and is particularly noted for the breadth and depth of his work in both natural and formal sciences.

Early life and education
Born in Colchester, Essex, Roger Penrose is a son of medical doctor Margaret (Leathes) and psychiatrist and geneticist Lionel Penrose. His paternal grandparents were J. Doyle Penrose, an Irish-born artist, and The Hon. Elizabeth Josephine, daughter of Alexander Peckover, 1st Baron Peckover; his maternal grandparents were physiologist John Beresford Leathes and Russian Jewish Sonia Marie Natanson. His uncle was artist Roland Penrose, whose son with photographer Lee Miller is Antony Penrose. Penrose is the brother of physicist Oliver Penrose, of geneticist Shirley Hodgson, and of chess Grandmaster Jonathan Penrose. Their stepfather was the mathematician and computer scientist Max Newman.

Penrose spent World War II as a child in Canada where his father worked in London, Ontario. Penrose studied at University College School. He attended University College London and attained a first class degree in mathematics from University of London in 1952.

In 1955, while a student, Penrose reintroduced the E. H. Moore generalised matrix inverse, also known as the Moore–Penrose inverse, after it had been reinvented by Arne Bjerhammar in 1951. Having started research under the professor of geometry and astronomy, Sir W. V. D. Hodge, Penrose finished his PhD at St John's College, Cambridge, in 1958, with a thesis on tensor methods in algebraic geometry supervised by algebraist and geometer John A. Todd. He devised and popularised the Penrose triangle in the 1950s in collaboration with his father, describing it as "impossibility in its purest form", and exchanged material with the artist M. C. Escher, whose earlier depictions of impossible objects partly inspired it. Escher's Waterfall, and Ascending and Descending were in turn inspired by Penrose.

As reviewer Manjit Kumar puts it:

Research and career
Penrose spent the academic year 1956–57 as an assistant lecturer at Bedford College, London and was then a research fellow at St John's College, Cambridge. During that three-year post, he married Joan Isabel Wedge, in 1959. Before the fellowship ended Penrose won a NATO Research Fellowship for 1959–61, first at Princeton and then at Syracuse University. Returning to the University of London, Penrose spent two years, 1961–63, as a researcher at King's College, London, before returning to the United States to spend the year 1963–64 as a visiting associate professor at the University of Texas at Austin. He later held visiting positions at Yeshiva, Princeton, and Cornell during 1966–67 and 1969.

In 1964, while a reader at Birkbeck College, London, (and having had his attention drawn from pure mathematics to astrophysics by the cosmologist Dennis Sciama, then at Cambridge) in the words of Kip Thorne of Caltech, "Roger Penrose revolutionised the mathematical tools that we use to analyse the properties of spacetime". Until then, work on the curved geometry of general relativity had been confined to configurations with sufficiently high symmetry for Einstein's equations to be solvable explicitly, and there was doubt about whether such cases were typical. One approach to this issue was by the use of perturbation theory, as developed under the leadership of John Archibald Wheeler at Princeton. The other, and more radically innovative, approach initiated by Penrose was to overlook the detailed geometrical structure of spacetime and instead concentrate attention just on the topology of the space, or at most its conformal structure, since it is the latter – as determined by the lay of the lightcones – that determines the trajectories of lightlike geodesics, and hence their causal relationships. The importance of Penrose's epoch-making paper "Gravitational Collapse and Space-Time Singularities" was not its only result, summarised roughly as that if an object such as a dying star implodes beyond a certain point, then nothing can prevent the gravitational field getting so strong as to form some kind of singularity. It also showed a way to obtain similarly general conclusions in other contexts, notably that of the cosmological Big Bang, which he dealt with in collaboration with Dennis Sciama's most famous student, Stephen Hawking. The Penrose–Hawking singularity theorems were inspired by Amal Kumar Raychaudhuri's Raychaudhuri equation.

It was in the local context of gravitational collapse that the contribution of Penrose was most decisive, starting with his 1969 cosmic censorship conjecture, to the effect that any ensuing singularities would be confined within a well-behaved event horizon surrounding a hidden space-time region for which Wheeler coined the term black hole, leaving a visible exterior region with strong but finite curvature, from which some of the gravitational energy may be extractable by what is known as the Penrose process, while accretion of surrounding matter may release further energy that can account for astrophysical phenomena such as quasars.

Following up his "weak cosmic censorship hypothesis", Penrose went on, in 1979, to formulate a stronger version called the "strong censorship hypothesis". Together with the Belinski–Khalatnikov–Lifshitz conjecture and issues of nonlinear stability, settling the censorship conjectures is one of the most important outstanding problems in general relativity. Also from 1979, dates Penrose's influential Weyl curvature hypothesis on the initial conditions of the observable part of the universe and the origin of the second law of thermodynamics. Penrose and James Terrell independently realised that objects travelling near the speed of light will appear to undergo a peculiar skewing or rotation. This effect has come to be called the Terrell rotation or Penrose–Terrell rotation.

In 1967, Penrose invented the twistor theory which maps geometric objects in Minkowski space into the 4-dimensional complex space with the metric signature (2,2).

Penrose is well known for his 1974 discovery of Penrose tilings, which are formed from two tiles that can only tile the plane nonperiodically, and are the first tilings to exhibit fivefold rotational symmetry. In 1984, such patterns were observed in the arrangement of atoms in quasicrystals. Another noteworthy contribution is his 1971 invention of spin networks, which later came to form the geometry of spacetime in loop quantum gravity. He was influential in popularizing what are commonly known as Penrose diagrams (causal diagrams).

In 1983, Penrose was invited to teach at Rice University in Houston, by the then provost Bill Gordon. He worked there from 1983 to 1987. His doctoral students have included, among others, Andrew Hodges, Lane Hughston, Richard Jozsa, Claude LeBrun, John McNamara, Tristan Needham, Tim Poston, Asghar Qadir, and Richard S. Ward. 

In 2004, Penrose released The Road to Reality: A Complete Guide to the Laws of the Universe, a 1,099-page comprehensive guide to the Laws of Physics that includes an explanation of his own theory.  The Penrose Interpretation predicts the relationship between quantum mechanics and general relativity, and proposes that a quantum state remains in superposition until the difference of space-time curvature attains a significant level.

Penrose is the Francis and Helen Pentz Distinguished Visiting Professor of Physics and Mathematics at Pennsylvania State University.

An earlier universe

In 2010, Penrose reported possible evidence, based on concentric circles found in Wilkinson Microwave Anisotropy Probe data of the cosmic microwave background sky, of an earlier universe existing before the Big Bang of our own present universe. He mentions this evidence in the epilogue of his 2010 book Cycles of Time, a book in which he presents his reasons, to do with Einstein's field equations, the Weyl curvature C, and the Weyl curvature hypothesis (WCH), that the transition at the Big Bang could have been smooth enough for a previous universe to survive it. He made several conjectures about C and the WCH, some of which were subsequently proved by others, and he also popularized his conformal cyclic cosmology (CCC) theory. In this theory, Penrose postulates that at the end of the universe all matter is eventually contained within black holes which subsequently evaporate via Hawking radiation. At this point, everything contained within the universe consists of photons which "experience" neither time nor space. There is essentially no difference between an infinitely large universe consisting only of photons and an infinitely small universe consisting only of photons. Therefore, a singularity for a Big Bang and an infinitely expanded universe are equivalent. 

In simple terms, Penrose believes that the singularity in Einstein's field equation at the Big Bang is only an apparent singularity, similar to the well-known apparent singularity at the event horizon of a black hole. The latter singularity can be removed by a change of coordinate system, and Penrose proposes a different change of coordinate system that will remove the singularity at the big bang. One implication of this is that the major events at the Big Bang can be understood without unifying general relativity and quantum mechanics, and therefore we are not necessarily constrained by the Wheeler–DeWitt equation, which disrupts time. Alternatively, one can use the Einstein–Maxwell–Dirac equations.

Consciousness

Penrose has written books on the connection between fundamental physics and human (or animal) consciousness. In The Emperor's New Mind (1989), he argues that known laws of physics are inadequate to explain the phenomenon of consciousness. Penrose proposes the characteristics this new physics may have and specifies the requirements for a bridge between classical and quantum mechanics (what he calls correct quantum gravity). Penrose uses a variant of Turing's halting theorem to demonstrate that a system can be deterministic without being algorithmic. (For example, imagine a system with only two states, ON and OFF. If the system's state is ON when a given Turing machine halts and OFF when the Turing machine does not halt, then the system's state is completely determined by the machine; nevertheless, there is no algorithmic way to determine whether the Turing machine stops.)

Penrose believes that such deterministic yet non-algorithmic processes may come into play in the quantum mechanical wave function reduction, and may be harnessed by the brain. He argues that computers today are unable to have intelligence because they are algorithmically deterministic systems. He argues against the viewpoint that the rational processes of the mind are completely algorithmic and can thus be duplicated by a sufficiently complex computer. This contrasts with supporters of strong artificial intelligence, who contend that thought can be simulated algorithmically. He bases this on claims that consciousness transcends formal logic because factors such as the insolubility of the halting problem and Gödel's incompleteness theorem prevent an algorithmically based system of logic from reproducing such traits of human intelligence as mathematical insight. These claims were originally espoused by the philosopher John Lucas of Merton College, Oxford. G. Hirase has paraphrased Penrose' argument and reinforced it.

The Penrose–Lucas argument about the implications of Gödel's incompleteness theorem for computational theories of human intelligence has been criticised by mathematicians, computer scientists and philosophers.  Many experts in these fields assert that Penrose's argument fails, though different authors may choose different aspects of the argument to attack. Marvin Minsky, a leading proponent of artificial intelligence, was particularly critical, stating that Penrose "tries to show, in chapter after chapter, that human thought cannot be based on any known scientific principle." Minsky's position is exactly the opposite – he believed that humans are, in fact, machines, whose functioning, although complex, is fully explainable by current physics. Minsky maintained that "one can carry that quest [for scientific explanation] too far by only seeking new basic principles instead of attacking the real detail. This is what I see in Penrose's quest for a new basic principle of physics that will account for consciousness."

Penrose responded to criticism of The Emperor's New Mind with his follow-up 1994 book Shadows of the Mind, and in 1997 with The Large, the Small and the Human Mind. In those works, he also combined his observations with those of anesthesiologist Stuart Hameroff.

Penrose and Hameroff have argued that consciousness is the result of quantum gravity effects in microtubules, which they dubbed Orch-OR (orchestrated objective reduction). Max Tegmark, in a paper in Physical Review E, calculated that the time scale of neuron firing and excitations in microtubules is slower than the decoherence time by a factor of at least 10,000,000,000. The reception of the paper is summed up by this statement in Tegmark's support: "Physicists outside the fray, such as IBM's John A. Smolin, say the calculations confirm what they had suspected all along. 'We're not working with a brain that's near absolute zero. It's reasonably unlikely that the brain evolved quantum behavior'". Tegmark's paper has been widely cited by critics of the Penrose–Hameroff position.

In their reply to Tegmark's paper, also published in Physical Review E, the physicists Scott Hagan, Jack Tuszyński and Hameroff claimed that Tegmark did not address the Orch-OR model, but instead a model of his own construction. This involved superpositions of quanta separated by 24 nm rather than the much smaller separations stipulated for Orch-OR. As a result, Hameroff's group claimed a decoherence time seven orders of magnitude greater than Tegmark's, but still well short of the 25 ms required if the quantum processing in the theory was to be linked to the 40 Hz gamma synchrony, as Orch-OR suggested. To bridge this gap, the group made a series of proposals. They supposed that the interiors of neurons could alternate between liquid and gel states. In the gel state, it was further hypothesized that the water electrical dipoles are oriented in the same direction, along the outer edge of the microtubule tubulin subunits. Hameroff et al. proposed that this ordered water could screen any quantum coherence within the tubulin of the microtubules from the environment of the rest of the brain. Each tubulin also has a tail extending out from the microtubules, which is negatively charged, and therefore attracts positively charged ions. It is suggested that this could provide further screening. Further to this, there was a suggestion that the microtubules could be pumped into a coherent state by biochemical energy. Finally, he suggested that the configuration of the microtubule lattice might be suitable for quantum error correction, a means of holding together quantum coherence in the face of environmental interaction.

Hameroff, in a lecture in part of a Google Tech talks series exploring quantum biology, gave an overview of current research in the area, and responded to subsequent criticisms of the Orch-OR model. In addition to this, a 2011 paper by Roger Penrose and Stuart Hameroff published in the Journal of Cosmology gives an updated model of their Orch-OR theory, in light of criticisms, and discusses the place of consciousness within the universe.

Phillip Tetlow, although himself supportive of Penrose's views, acknowledges that Penrose's ideas about the human thought process are at present a minority view in scientific circles, citing Minsky's criticisms and quoting science journalist Charles Seife's description of Penrose as "one of a handful of scientists" who believe that the nature of consciousness suggests a quantum process.

In January 2014, Hameroff and Penrose ventured that a discovery of quantum vibrations in microtubules by Anirban Bandyopadhyay of the National Institute for Materials Science in Japan supports the hypothesis of Orch-OR theory. A reviewed and updated version of the theory was published along with critical commentary and debate in the March 2014 issue of Physics of Life Reviews.

Publications 
His popular publications include:
 The Emperor's New Mind: Concerning Computers, Minds, and The Laws of Physics (1989)
 Shadows of the Mind: A Search for the Missing Science of Consciousness (1994)
 The Road to Reality: A Complete Guide to the Laws of the Universe (2004)
 Cycles of Time: An Extraordinary New View of the Universe (2010)
 Fashion, Faith, and Fantasy in the New Physics of the Universe (2016)

His co-authored publications include:
 The Nature of Space and Time (with Stephen Hawking) (1996)
 The Large, the Small and the Human Mind (with Abner Shimony, Nancy Cartwright, and Stephen Hawking) (1997)
 White Mars: The Mind Set Free (with Brian Aldiss) (1999)

His academic books include:
 Techniques of Differential Topology in Relativity (1972)
 Spinors and Space-Time: Volume 1, Two-Spinor Calculus and Relativistic Fields (with Wolfgang Rindler, 1987)  (paperback)
 Spinors and Space-Time: Volume 2, Spinor and Twistor Methods in Space-Time Geometry (with Wolfgang Rindler, 1988) (reprint),  (paperback)

His forewords to other books include:
 Foreword to “The Map and the Territory: Exploring the foundations of science, thought and reality” by Shyam Wuppuluri and Francisco Antonio Doria. Published by Springer in "The Frontiers Collection", 2018.
 Foreword to Beating the Odds: The Life and Times of E. A. Milne, written by Meg Weston Smith. Published by World Scientific Publishing Co in June 2013.
 Foreword to "A Computable Universe" by Hector Zenil. Published by World Scientific Publishing Co in December 2012.
 Foreword to Quantum Aspects of Life by Derek Abbott, Paul C. W. Davies, and Arun K. Pati. Published by Imperial College Press in 2008.
 Foreword to Fearful Symmetry by Anthony Zee's. Published by Princeton University Press in 2007.

Awards and honours

Penrose has been awarded many prizes for his contributions to science.
In 1971, he was awarded the Dannie Heineman Prize for Astrophysics. He was elected a Fellow of the Royal Society (FRS) in 1972. In 1975, Stephen Hawking and Penrose were jointly awarded the Eddington Medal of the Royal Astronomical Society. In 1985, he was awarded the Royal Society Royal Medal. Along with Stephen Hawking, he was awarded the prestigious Wolf Foundation Prize for Physics in 1988.

In 1989, Penrose was awarded the Dirac Medal and Prize of the British Institute of Physics. He is also made an Honorary Fellow of the Institute of Physics (HonFInstP).

In 1990, Penrose was awarded the Albert Einstein Medal for outstanding work related to the work of Albert Einstein by the Albert Einstein Society. In 1991, he was awarded the Naylor Prize of the London Mathematical Society. From 1992 to 1995, he served as President of the International Society on General Relativity and Gravitation.
In 1994, Penrose was knighted for services to science. In the same year, he was also awarded an Honorary Degree (Doctor of Science) by the University of Bath, and became a member of Polish Academy of Sciences. In 1998, he was elected Foreign Associate of the United States National Academy of Sciences. In 2000, he was appointed a Member of the Order of Merit (OM).

In 2004, he was awarded the De Morgan Medal for his wide and original contributions to mathematical physics. To quote the citation from the London Mathematical Society:

In 2005, Penrose was awarded an honorary doctorate by Warsaw University and Katholieke Universiteit Leuven (Belgium), and in 2006 by the University of York. In 2006, he also won the Dirac Medal given by the University of New South Wales. In 2008, Penrose was awarded the Copley Medal. He is also a Distinguished Supporter of Humanists UK and one of the patrons of the Oxford University Scientific Society.

He was elected to the American Philosophical Society in 2011. The same year, he was also awarded the Fonseca Prize by the University of Santiago de Compostela.

In 2012, Penrose was awarded the Richard R. Ernst Medal by ETH Zürich for his contributions to science and strengthening the connection between science and society.  In 2015 Penrose was awarded an honorary doctorate by CINVESTAV-IPN (Mexico).

In 2017, he was awarded the Commandino Medal at the Urbino University for his contributions to the history of science.

In 2020, Penrose was awarded one half of the Nobel Prize in Physics for the discovery that black hole formation is a robust prediction of the general theory of relativity, a half-share also going to Reinhard Genzel and Andrea Ghez for the discovery of a supermassive compact object at the centre of our galaxy.

Personal life
Penrose married Vanessa Thomas, director of Academic Development at Cokethorpe School and former head of mathematics at Abingdon School, with whom he has one son. He has three sons from a previous marriage to American Joan Isabel Penrose (née Wedge), whom he married in 1959.

Religious views 

During an interview with BBC Radio 4 on 25 September 2010, Penrose stated, "I'm not a believer myself. I don't believe in established religions of any kind." He regards himself as an agnostic. In the 1991 film A Brief History of Time, he also said, "I think I would say that the universe has a purpose, it's not somehow just there by chance … some people, I think, take the view that the universe is just there and it runs along—it's a bit like it just sort of computes, and we happen somehow by accident to find ourselves in this thing. But I don't think that's a very fruitful or helpful way of looking at the universe, I think that there is something much deeper about it."

Penrose is a patron of Humanists UK.

References

Notes

External links

 Awake in the Universe – Penrose debates how creativity, the most elusive of faculties, has helped us unlock the country of the mind and the mysteries of the cosmos with Bonnie Greer.
 
  – Penrose was one of the principal interviewees in a BBC documentary about the mathematics of infinity directed by David Malone
 Penrose's new theory "Aeons Before the Big Bang?":
 Original 2005 lecture: "Before the Big Bang? A new perspective on the Weyl curvature hypothesis"  (Isaac Newton Institute for Mathematical Sciences, Cambridge, 11 November 2005).
 Original publication: "Before the Big Bang: an outrageous new perspective and its implications for particle physics". Proceedings of EPAC 2006. Edinburgh. 2759–2762 (cf. also Hill, C.D. & Nurowski, P. (2007) "On Penrose's 'Before the Big Bang' ideas". Ithaca)
 Revised 2009 lecture: "Aeons Before the Big Bang?" (Georgia Institute of Technology, Center for Relativistic Astrophysics)
 
 Roger Penrose on The Forum
 
 Hilary Putnam's review of Penrose's 'Shadows of the Mind' claiming that Penrose's use of Godel's Incompleteness Theorem is fallacious 
 
 Penrose Tiling found in Islamic Architecture
 Two theories for the formation of quasicrystals resembling Penrose tilings
 
 "Biological feasibility of quantum states in the brain" – (a disputation of Tegmark's result by Hagan, Hameroff, and Tuszyński)
 Tegmarks's rejoinder to Hagan et al.
  – D. Trull about Penrose's lawsuit concerning the use of his Penrose tilings on toilet paper
 Roger Penrose: A Knight on the tiles (Plus Magazine)
 Penrose's Gifford Lecture biography
 Quantum-Mind
 Audio: Roger Penrose in conversation on the BBC World Service discussion show
 Roger Penrose speaking about Hawking's new book on Premier Christian Radio
 "The Cyclic Universe – A conversation with Roger Penrose", Ideas Roadshow, 2013
 Forbidden crystal symmetry in mathematics and architecture, filmed event at the Royal Institution, October 2013
 Oxford Mathematics Interviews: "Extra Time: Professor Sir Roger Penrose in conversation with Andrew Hodges." These two films explore the development of Sir Roger Penrose's thought over more than 60 years, ending with his most recent theories and predictions. 51 min and 42 min. (Mathematical Institute)
 BBC Radio 4 – The Life Scientific – Roger Penrose on Black Holes – 22 November 2016 Sir Roger Penrose talks to Jim Al-Khalili about his trailblazing work on how black holes form, the problems with quantum physics and his portrayal in films about Stephen Hawking.
 The Penrose Institute Website
 A chess problem holds the key to human consciousness?, Chessbase
 

1931 births
Living people
People from Colchester
20th-century British mathematicians
Mathematics popularizers
20th-century  British philosophers
20th-century British physicists
21st-century British  mathematicians
21st-century  British philosophers
21st-century  British physicists
Academics of Birkbeck, University of London
Academics of King's College London
Albert Einstein Medal recipients
Alumni of St John's College, Cambridge
Alumni of the University of London
Alumni of University College London
British expatriate academics in the United States
British Nobel laureates
British consciousness researchers and theorists
English agnostics
English humanists
English expatriates in the United States
British geometers
English people of Russian-Jewish descent
English science writers
Recreational mathematicians
Fellows of the Royal Society
Foreign associates of the National Academy of Sciences
Fellows of Wadham College, Oxford
Knights Bachelor
Mathematical physicists
Members of the Order of Merit
Nobel laureates in Physics
Pennsylvania State University faculty
People educated at University College School
Philosophers of science
Professors of Gresham College
Quantum mind
Quantum physicists
Recipients of the Copley Medal
British relativity theorists
Rice University faculty
Rouse Ball Professors of Mathematics (University of Oxford)
Royal Medal winners
Wolf Prize in Physics laureates
English people of Irish descent
Recipients of the Dalton Medal